Çobankərəhməz (also, Choban-Karikl’yev and Chobankerakhmez) is a village in the Kalbajar Rayon of Azerbaijan.

References 

Populated places in Kalbajar District